Paddy "Rusty" Ruschitzko (29 April 1917 – 4 March 2004) was an American-born Irish sportsperson.  He played hurling with his local club Clonad and was a member of the Laois senior inter-county team from the 1930s until the 1950s.  Ruschitzko captained Laois in their last All-Ireland final appearance in 1949.

Biography

Patrick Ruschitzko was brought up in Muine Bheag, County Carlow, where his mother brought the family on the death of her husband.

Ruschitzko was educated locally, however, the family later moved to Mountmellick, County Laois.  It was here that his hurling skills were first noted.  Ruschitzko, however, later emigrated to England for a period.  On his return he joined the staff of Irish Worsted Mills in Portlaoise.  He ended up as manager of the mills and remained there until the firm's closure in 1973. 
He married Lillian Dunne and had three children, two girls and one boy who died at a very young age. 

Paddy Ruschitzko died 4 March 2004.

Playing career

Club

With his club, Clonad, Ruschitzko won over 20 major honours and was part of the three-in-a-row team that won the Laois Senior Hurling Championship in 1946, ‘47 and ‘48.

Inter-county
Having moved to live in Mountmellick, he starred on the Laois minor team which was denied All-Ireland Minor Hurling Championship glory in 1934 in the final, which Tipperary won by one point after a long period of injury time. 

In 1949, Paddy was captain of the Laois team which won the Leinster Senior Hurling Championship. Playing at left half back he marked the legendary Jimmy Langton and Laois scored a shock 4–5 to 2–7 win over a powerful Kilkenny team. 

In the All-Ireland semi-final, Laois defeated Galway 4–6 to 3–5, leaving Paddy to lead out his team in the All-Ireland final parade opposite his old school colleague, Pat Stakelum, who was captain of the Tipperary team. Tipperary  ran out easy winners but Ruschitzko's place in Gaelic Athletic Association history is secure as Laois haven't won a Leinster title since.

References

Teams

1917 births
2004 deaths
Clonad hurlers
Laois inter-county hurlers
Irish people of Ukrainian descent
Irish people of Polish descent
American emigrants to Ireland